Sigma is a punk rock band from Phoenix, Arizona, United States, founded by Keith Wallace, Jonathan Kabir and Jeff Harder. In 2002, Kabir met Harder, whose 80s metal band then needed a vocalist. Kabir admitted that at first he did not like Harder's vocals, but liked his punk style. Harder soon introduced Kabir to Wallace, and the three decided to form a punk rock band. 

The band toured worldwide as a three-piece and played over 400 shows together. Harder left the band in 2008 to move with his family to Washington. Kabir and Wallace kept the band going and added oChris Clement, Chris Griswold, Clayton Graham and Justin James. The band adopted more of a metal sound. They often used fake blood and a horror art in their stage performances. 

Kabir and Wallace have started a new project as a two-piece called The Tak3down. No music has been released.

Discography

Studio albums 
 Stars and Fights (2004)
 Violence Speaks Louder Than Words (2006)
 Buried In Black and White (2008)
 The Phoenix (2010)

EPs 
 Sigma S/T (2008)

Singles 
 Stars and Fights (2004)
 Grass Is Greener (2006)
 Porcelain Doll (2008)
 Screaming in Shadows (2010)

DVDs 
 Die or Eat Us (2007)

References

  The New times review of Violence Speaks Louder Than Words album
    Press release for second album

External links
 The band's official Facebook page

Punk rock groups from Arizona
Musical groups from Phoenix, Arizona